The 1997 World Fencing Championships were held from 13 July to 19 July 1997 in Cape Town, South Africa at the newly constructed Foreshore Exhibition Centre.

Medal summary

Men's events

Women's events

Medal table

References
FIE Results

World Fencing Championships
1997 in South African sport
1990s in Cape Town
Sports competitions in Cape Town
1997 in fencing
International fencing competitions hosted by South Africa
July 1997 sports events in Africa